Ásla Johannesen (born 9 May 1996) is a Faroese football midfielder who currently plays for AGF and the Faroe Islands women's national football team.

International goals

Honours 

KÍ
1. deild kvinnur: 2011, 2012 
Steypakappingin kvinnur: 2012

References 

1996 births
Living people
Faroese women's footballers
Faroe Islands women's youth international footballers
Faroe Islands women's international footballers
Women's association football midfielders
KÍ Klaksvík players
FC Nordsjælland (women) players
AGF Fodbold (women) players